The following lists events that happened in 1951 in Iceland.

Incumbents
President – Sveinn Björnsson
Prime Minister – Steingrímur Steinþórsson

Events

Births

1 March – Kristinn Sigmundsson, singer.
8 April – Geir Haarde, politician
1 May – Álfheiður Ingadóttir, politician
18 July – Thorvaldur Gylfason, economist

Full date missing
Karólína Eiríksdóttir, composer

Deaths

References

 
1950s in Iceland
Iceland
Iceland
Years of the 20th century in Iceland